Cissus anisophylla is a plant species known from lowland rainforests of Panamá, Colombia, Chiapas, Brazil, Perú, Costa Rica and Ecuador.

Cissus anisophylla is a liana climbing over other vegetation by means of branched tendrils. Stems are round in cross-section, hairless. Leaves are broadly ovate, up to 14 cm long and 10 cm across. Flowers are green, about 5 mm in diameter, borne in compound cymes up to 6 cm across, with minutely hairy peduncles.

References

anisophylla
Flora of Chiapas
Flora of Panama
Flora of Costa Rica
Flora of Colombia
Flora of Ecuador
Flora of Peru